South African hip hop artist and record producer AKA has released four studio albums, two collaborative albums with Anatii as well as Costa Titch respectively, one extended play (EP), 42 singles (including 20 as a featured artist) and 23 music videos. AKA's music has been released on record labels Sony Music Entertainment Africa, Vth Season and Beam Group.

AKA's debut studio album Altar Ego, was released on 23 August 2011 and issued on independent record label Vth Season. The album was preceded by three singles. The lead single "I Want It All" which features rappers, Khuli Chana and Pro was released on 28 July 2010. The second single "Victory Lap" was released on 3 December 2010 with the third single "All I Know" being released on 11 July 2011. Alter Ego won Best Newcomer, Best Hip Hop Album and Best Produced Album at the 2011 Metro FM Music Awards which took place on 26 November 2011 at Mbombela Stadium in Mbombela (Nelspruit), Mpumalanga. The album also won Best Street Urban Music Album and Male Artist of the Year at the 18th edition of the South African Music Awards (SAMAs) which were held at Sun City, North West on 30 April 2012. Alter Ego was  certified gold by the Recording Industry of South Africa (RiSA).

AKA's second debut studio album Levels was released on 30 June 30, 2014. The album's release was preceded by four singles "Jealousy", "Kontrol", "Congratulate" and "Run Jozi (Godly)" which features rapper, K.O. Originally slated for physical release on 8 July 2014, the hard copies of the album were later released on 28 July 2014 due to manufacturing issues. Levels won Best Male, Video of the Year for "Congratulate", and Best Collaboration for "Run Jozi (Godly)" at the 2014 South African Hip Hop Awards and won Male Artist of the Year at the 21st South African Music Awards which took place on 19 April 2015 at Sun City, North West. Levels is certified 7× Platinum by RiSA. On 28 July 2017, AKA released the collaborative studio album Be Careful What You Wish For with South African record producer and musician Anatii.

On 15 June 2018, AKA released his third and last solo studio album Touch My Blood which was issued on his independent record label Beam Group. The album was originally set to release on 25 May 2018 but delayed because he needed more time to shoot videos, release singles, drop merchandise and confirm tour dates. Touch My Blood was preceded by five singles, "The World Is Yours" and "Caiphus Song" which are certified triple platinum and gold respectively by RiSA. "Star Signs" which features South African rapper and poet Stogie T, "Sweet Fire" and "Beyonce" also preceded the album. Touch My Blood is certified Platinum by the Recording Industry of South Africa (RiSA). In 2019 he released "Jika" with Yanga Chief. 

AKA's fourth studio album  Mass Country was released posthumously on February 24, 2023 through Sony and Vth A. It reached 6 million+ streams on Spotify and certified gold in South Africa.

Albums

Studio albums

Extended plays

Singles

As lead artist

As featured artist

Guest appearances

Music videos

As lead artist

References

External links 
 

Discographies of South African artists
Hip hop discographies
Discography